, also known as , are a Japanese rock band from Onomichi (formerly Innoshima), Hiroshima Prefecture. The band got their name from the album Pornograffitti by the band Extreme. They currently record under the SME Records label and their agency is Amuse, Inc.

Haruichi Shindō originally formed the band with his cousin during high school and named it "No Score." After the band started, Haruichi asked Akihito Okano and Tama to join. The band was so named because none of them could actually read a score when they first started. When they first started the band Haruichi was the vocalist, but he found out that Akihito could sing better and gave the vocalist position to Akihito, taking over as guitarist instead. This was the foundation of Porno Graffitti. They debuted with the song Apollo in 1999. Their two subsequent CD singles, Saudade and Agehachō, both sold over a million copies in Japan.

The band is well known for their work in creating music for anime series and movies. They are particularly well known for the song "Melissa," which was used as the opening theme of the anime series Fullmetal Alchemist in 2003. In addition, they have created the songs "Hitori no Yoru" for the second opening theme of the anime series GTO (2000), "Winding Road" for the ending theme of the anime series Ayakashi Ayashi (2006), "The Day" for the first opening theme of the anime series My Hero Academia (2015), "Montage" for an opening theme of the anime Puzzle & Dragons X and most recently "Hikari Are", the first opening theme of The Seven Deadly Sins: Dragon's Judgement, the final season of The Seven Deadly Sins (manga).

Their song "Koyoi, Tsuki ga, Miezu Tomo" was featured in the third Bleach film, and their single "Anima Rossa" was featured as the eleventh opening to Bleach. Their single "2012Spark" was featured as the main theme song of the movie Gyakuten Saiban and their single "Matataku Hoshi no Shita de" was the second opening theme for the anime Magi: The Labyrinth of Magic. Their single "Oh! Rival" is part of the soundtrack for the 2019 Detective Conan film.

They are also featured in video game music, with a cover of their 2000 single "Music Hour" used for a stage of the Nintendo DS rhythm game Moero! Nekketsu Rhythm Damashii Osu! Tatakae! Ouendan 2.

Porno Graffitti

Current members 
 Akihito Okano (岡野 昭仁 Okano Akihito, born October 15, 1974) — Lead vocals and rhythm guitar
 Haruichi Shindō (新藤 晴一 Shindō Haruichi, born September 20, 1974) — Lead guitar and backing vocals

Past member 
 Masami "Tama" Shiratama (白玉 雅己, Shiratama Masami) — Bass guitar and backing vocals (left in June 2004)

Discography

Singles 
  - September 8, 1999
  - January 26, 2000
  - July 12, 2000
  - September 13, 2000
  - December 6, 2000
  - June 27, 2001
  - October 17, 2001
  - March 6, 2002
 "Mugen" – May 15, 2002
  - February 5, 2003
  - August 6, 2003
  - September 26, 2003
  - November 6, 2003
  - December 3, 2003
  - September 8, 2004
  - November 10, 2004
  - March 2, 2005
  - August 3, 2005
  - November 16, 2005
  - June 28, 2006
 "Winding Road" – October 4, 2006
  - July 18, 2007
  - February 14, 2008
  - June 25, 2008
  - August 20, 2008
 "Love,too Death,too" – October 8, 2008
  - December 10, 2008
  - September 9, 2009
  - November 25, 2009
  - February 10, 2010
  - October 27, 2010
 "EXIT" – March 2, 2011
  - September 21, 2011
  - November 23, 2011
 "2012 Spark" – February 8, 2012
  - September 19, 2012
  - March 6, 2013
  - September 11, 2013
  - October 16, 2013
  - September 3, 2014
  - November 5, 2014
  - April 15, 2015
 "THE DAY" – May 25, 2016
  - November 9, 2016
  - September 6, 2017
  - March 21, 2018
  - July 25, 2018
 "VS" – July 31, 2019

Digital Single 
 "m-FLOOD" – February 28, 2007
 "Zombies are standing out" – September 28, 2018
 "Flower" (フラワー Furawaa) – December 14, 2018

Albums

Original albums 
 - March 8, 2000
foo? – February 28, 2001
 - March 27, 2002
Worldillia – February 26, 2003
Thumpx – April 20, 2005
M-CABI – November 22, 2006
The 7th Album Porno Graffitti – August 29, 2007
[[Trigger (album)|Trigger]] – March 24, 2010Panorama Porno – March 28, 2012Rhinoceros – August 19, 2015Butterly Effect – October 25, 2017
 - August 3, 2022

 Best albums Porno Graffitti Best Red's – July 28, 2004Porno Graffitti Best Blue's – July 28, 2004Porno Graffitti Best Ace – October 29, 2008Porno Graffitti Best Joker – October 29, 2008PORNOGRAFFITTI 15th Anniversary "ALL TIME SINGLES" – November 20, 2013

 DVDs 
 Tour 08452: Welcome to My Heart (September 6, 2000)
 Porno Graffitti Visual Works Opening Lap (March 14, 2001)
 "Bitter Sweet Music Biz" Live in Budokan 2002 (March 26, 2003)
 "74ers" Live in Osaka-Jo Hall 2003 (March 24, 2004)
 5th Anniversary Special Live "Purple's" in Tokyo Taiikukan 2004 (March 24, 2005)
 7th Live Circuit "Switch" 2005 (March 29, 2006)
 Yokohama Romance Porno '06: Catch the Haneuma: In Yokohama Stadium (February 28, 2007)
 "Open Music Cabinet" Live in Saitama Super Arena 2007（October 31, 2007）
  "Porno Graffitti Has Come" Live in Zepp Tokyo 2008 (May 21, 2008)
  "Awaji Yokohama Romance Porno'08, 10 Year's of Gift!" Live in Awajishima (January 28, 2009)
  OPENING LAP (September 9, 2009)
  PG CLIPS 2nd LAP (September 9, 2009)
  PG CLIPS 3rd LAP (September 9, 2009)
  PG CLIPS 4th LAP (September 9, 2009)
  "Royal Straight Flush" LIVE IN YOYOGI DAIICHI TAIIKUKAN 2009 (October 28, 2009)
  "Target" Live in JCB Hall 2010 (9 Maret 2011)
  Tsumagoi no Romance Porno '11 "Porno Maru" (December 21, 2011)
  Makuhari Romance Porno '11 "Days of Wonder" (July 4, 2012)
  12th LIVE CIRCUIT "PANORAMA x 42" SPECIAL LIVE PACKAGE (April 3, 2013)
  13th Live Circuit "Love E-Mail From 1999" Live in MARINE MESSE FUKUOKA  (August 6, 2014)
  "Kobe Yohohama Romance Porno'13 ~Madowazu no Mori~ Live at Yokohama Stadium " (February 25, 2015)
  14th Live Circuit "The dice are cast " Live in OSAKA-JO HALL 2015 (April 13, 2016)
  "FANCLUB UNDERWORLD 5　Live in Zepp DiverCity 2016"  (October 26, 2016)
  "Yokohama Romance Porno '16 ～THE WAY～ Live in YOKOHAMA STADIUM"  (April 26, 2017)
  PORNOGRAFFITTI "Sèqíng túyā" Special Live in Taiwan (December 20, 2017)
  15th Live Circuit "BUTTERFLY EFFECT" Live in KOBE KOKUSAI HALL 2018 (September 5, 2018)

 Books 
 The History of Porno Graffitti from Innoshima (ワイラノ クロニクル, March 23, 2001)
 Real Days (April 19, 2004)
 Porno Graffitti Document Photo Book 7th Live Circuit "Switch" (March 29, 2006)
 Bessatsu Kadokawa Sōryoku Tokushū Porno Graffitti "Chōsen" (April 6, 2012)
 PORNOGRAFFITTI × PATi►PATi COMPLETE BOOK ～15years file～ (October 1, 2014)

 Concert Tours 
 LIVE CIRCUIT
 1st Live Circuit "Tour 08452: Welcome to My Heart"
 2nd Live Circuit "D4-33-4"
 3rd Live Circuit "Japan Tour"
 4th Live Circuit "Cupid (Is Painted Blind)"
 5th LIVE CIRCUIT "BITTER SWEET MUSIC BIZ"
 6th LIVE CIRCUIT "74ers"
 C1000 Takeda Presents 7th LIVE CIRCUIT "SWITCH"
 8th LIVE CIRCUIT "OPEN MUSIC CABINET"
 SUBARU IMPREZA presents 9th LIVE CIRCUIT "Porno Graffitti ga Yatte kita"
 10th LIVE CIRCUIT "Royal Straight Flush"
 11th LIVE CIRCUIT "∠TARGET"
 12th LIVE CIRCUIT "PANORAMA×42"
 13th LIVE CIRCUIT "Love E-Mail From 1999"
 14th LIVE CIRCUIT "The dice are cast"
 15th LIVE CIRCUIT "BUTTERFLY EFFECT"
 16th LIVE CIRCUIT "UNFADED"

 Movie 
Shindō appeared in the movie Road 88: Deai-michi Shikoku e'' (ロード88 出会い路、四国へ) in 2003 (road show in 2004). He played a gangster by the name of Bessho (別所). This is the first and only movie in which he has appeared.

See also 
 Masami Shiratama
 Innoshima, Hiroshima

Notes

References

External links 

 Official website of Porno Graffitti 
 Official website by SME Records 

Japanese rock music groups
Japanese pop music groups
Rock music duos
Sony Music Entertainment Japan artists
Musical groups established in 1994
Musical groups from Hiroshima Prefecture
Amuse Inc. artists
People from Onomichi, Hiroshima